This is a list of the Saudi Arabia national football team results from 1980 to 1999.

Results

1980

1981

1982

1984

1985

1986

1988

1989

1990

1992

1993

1994

1995

1996

1997

1998

1999

See also 
Saudi Arabia national football team results (2000–09)
Saudi Arabia national football team results (2010–19)
Saudi Arabia national football team results (2020–present)

Notes

References

External links
Saudi Arabia fixtures on eloratings.net
Saudi Team
Saudi Arabia on soccerway.com

1980s in Saudi Arabian sport
1990s in Saudi Arabian sport
1980